Johannes Bernardus van Bree (29 January 1801 – 14 February 1857) was a Dutch composer, violinist and conductor.

Van Bree was born and died in Amsterdam.  He was a pupil of Jan George Bertelman.

From 1829 to the year of his death he directed the Felix Meritis Society. He was  also the director of the Music School of the Society of the Promotion of Music, Amsterdam.

As a conductor he gave the Dutch premieres of Berlioz' Symphonie fantastique (in 1855) and Richard Wagner's Faust Overture (1856).

Incomplete list of works

Operas
Sappho
Nimm dich in Acht
Le Bandit (overture recorded on NM Classics)
Choral and Vocal Works
Mass for Soloists, Mixed Chorus and Orchestra in A flat (ca. 1830)
Mass for Two-Part Chorus and Organ in F
Three Masses "tribus vocibus humanis, comitante organo" for Three-Part Male Chorus and Organ (1837)
Cantata "St. Cecilia's Day" (in D)
Psalm 84 (1840s?)
Orchestral and Chamber works
Overture in B minor
Overture in E flat major (1839)
Scene, for Horn and Orchestra (1841)
Variations for violin and piano (1837)
Violin Concerto in D minor
Allegro for Four String Quartets in D minor (about 1845)
Scherzi, for the piano (about 1855?)
String Quartets - no. 1 in A minor (about 1834), no. 2 in E flat (about 1840, dedicated to Bernhard Molique), no. 3 in D minor (ca. 1848).

References

External links
 

1801 births
1857 deaths
19th-century classical composers
19th-century classical violinists
19th-century conductors (music)
Dutch classical composers
Dutch classical violinists
Dutch conductors (music)
Male conductors (music)
Dutch male classical composers
Dutch opera composers
Male opera composers
Male classical violinists
Musicians from Amsterdam
Dutch Romantic composers